Marama Mere-Ana Davidson (née Paratene; born 1973) is a New Zealand politician who entered the New Zealand Parliament in 2015 as a representative of the Green Party of Aotearoa New Zealand, of which she is the female co-leader.

In October 2020, the Green Party signed a cooperation agreement to support a Labour-led government. Davidson became the Minister outside Cabinet for the Prevention of Family and Sexual Violence, as well as holding the Associate Housing portfolio.

Early life and education
Davidson was born in Auckland and is of Ngāti Porou, Te Rarawa, and Ngāpuhi descent. Her father is the actor Rawiri Paratene. Both her parents were Māori language campaigners in the 1970s. During her youth, the family moved a lot; Davidson started school in Wellington, but subsequently lived in Dunedin and Christchurch. At age nine, her family moved to Whirinaki in the Hokianga, where she spent the rest of her childhood. She started her degree in Hamilton and finished it in Auckland, from where she graduated with a Bachelor of Arts. She also holds a Graduate Diploma in International Diplomacy for Indigenous Studies through Te Whare Wānanga o Awanuiārangi.

Professional career and community engagement
Davidson worked for the Human Rights Commission from 2003 to 2012. She has worked part-time for Breastfeeding New Zealand. She was a 'Think Tank Member' for the Owen Glenn Inquiry on Child Abuse and Domestic Violence. She is a founding member of Te Wharepora Hou Māori Women's Collective.

Political career

Fifth National Government, 2013–2017
Davidson is an environmentalist and human rights advocate. In June 2013 she stood for the Greens in the Ikaroa-Rāwhiti by-election, where she came fourth with 11.15% of the vote.

At the 2014 election she stood in the  electorate. She was ranked 15th on the Greens party list and entered Parliament in 2015 with the resignation of Russel Norman.

Davidson has called for liberalisation of abortion law, in addition to better sex education, improved access to contraception, and more support for adoption, having had an abortion as a teenager.

During the 2017 general election, Davidson was ranked second in the Green Party's final candidate list in April 2017. Following the release of the full election results on 7 October, Davidson was reinstated as a list Member of Parliament. The Green Party won 6.3 percent of the votes and eight seats.

Sixth Labour Government, 2017–present

Following the resignation of Metiria Turei as co-leader of the Green Party in 2017, Davidson was poised as a possible contender for the co-leadership. On 4 February 2018, Davidson officially announced her candidacy for co-leader, and on 8 April won the female co-leadership election, defeating fellow MP Julie Anne Genter who also contested the position.
After summing the co-leadership of the Greens, Marama stated that the Greens' responsibility was to push the Labour-led coalition government in a progressive direction including the abolition of letting fees on rental homes.

On 8 July 2018, Davidson reported that she had received rape and death threats against her and her children on social media after tweeting support for the Mayor of Auckland Phil Goff's decision to ban two Canadian far right speakers Lauren Southern and Stefan Molyneux from Auckland Council facilities as part of a speaking tour in August 2018.

In response to this, Davidson stated during an anti-racism rally, attended by families with children, that New Zealand needs to reclaim the word "cunt".

In 25 March 2020, Davidson became a member of the Epidemic Response Committee, a select committee that considered the government's response to the COVID-19 pandemic.

During the 2020 general election on 17 October, Davidson was re-elected to Parliament on the party list. Davidson also contested Tāmaki Makaurau, coming third place behind Labour incumbent Peeni Henare and the Māori Party's candidate John Tamihere. The Greens captured 7.9% of the popular vote (226,754).

Following prolonged negotiations between the Greens and Labour which concluded in a "cooperation" agreement on 31 October 2020, Davidson was designated as the Minister for the Prevention of Family and Sexual Violence and also became Associate Minister of Housing with responsibility for homelessness.

Davidson was challenged in May 2021 by the National and Act parties for attending and speaking at a Mongrel Mob gathering at the Waikato Chapters  headquarters in Hamilton. Davidson attended the gathering with fellow Green MP Elizabeth Kerekere and the Human Rights Commissioner Paul Hunt. The gathering discussed human rights, justice and racism and Davidson defended attending and speaking at the gathering saying in a tweet that it was a "fabulous community event for justice". Davidson also defended attending the gathering saying that it is vital that a range of communities are engaged with and tweeting that gangs were part of the "diverse communities, who have been subject to enduring and systemic racism".

Personal life and family
Marama Davidson is married to Paul Davidson, with whom she has six children; their last child was born in 2008. Davidson is a qualified aerobics instructor and used to teach part-time classes at Les Mills International in order to support her children and university studies.

In late June 2018, Davidson disclosed that she had been sexually abused as an eight-year-old child by a distant relative during a Speaking Secrets podcast, a co-production by The New Zealand Herald and Newstalk ZB. During the New Zealand Parliament's formal apology to homosexual men convicted of consensual acts before the passage of the Homosexual Law Reform Act in 1986, Davidson acknowledged that her uncle had assaulted a gay man after reacting badly to his proposition. Her uncle was subsequently convicted of manslaughter and imprisoned when the victim fell into Wellington Harbour and drowned. Davidson apologised on behalf of her late uncle to the LGBT community in New Zealand.

Political views and positions

Donald Trump
On 5 June 2020, Davidson and fellow Greens Co-Leader James Shaw described United States President Donald Trump as a racist in response to a question fielded by press gallery journalists following the protests triggered by the murder of George Floyd in late May.

Israel-Palestine
In October 2016, Davidson took part in the Women's Boat to Gaza, which intended to highlight the Israeli blockade of the Gaza Strip. Other passengers aboard included the Nobel Peace Prize laureate Mairead Maguire and retired US Army colonel Ann Wright. On 5 October, the Women's Peace Flotilla's ship Zaytouna Oliva was intercepted by the Israeli Navy. In response to the boarding of the Women's Peace Flotilla, Green Party co-leader Metiria Turei called on the Israeli authorities to release Davidson and other activists, and to end the blockade of Gaza.

On 11 May 2021, she and 16 other New Zealand Members of Parliament donned keffiyeh to mark World Keffiyeh Day.

References

External links
Green Party profile
Profile at New Zealand Parliament website

1973 births
Living people
Green Party of Aotearoa New Zealand MPs
Green Party of Aotearoa New Zealand co-leaders
Members of the New Zealand House of Representatives
New Zealand list MPs
New Zealand activists
New Zealand women activists
Ngāti Porou people
Ngāpuhi people
New Zealand Māori women
Māori MPs
University of Auckland alumni
University of Waikato alumni
Women members of the New Zealand House of Representatives
People from Auckland
21st-century New Zealand politicians
21st-century New Zealand women politicians
Candidates in the 2017 New Zealand general election
Candidates in the 2020 New Zealand general election
Government ministers of New Zealand
Women government ministers of New Zealand